Ayatollah Nematollah Salehi Najafabadi (1923/24 in Najafabad, Isfahan province – 2006 in Tehran) was an Iranian cleric, scholar and proponent of Islamic Unity, who spent most years after the Iranian revolution of 1979 under house arrest.

The Special Court for the Clergy had ordered that he do not teach and receive students. His writings were censored.

Background
Nematollah Salehi Najafabadi was born in 1923/24 and studied in Isfahan with Rahim Arbab and Mohammad Hasan Alem Najafabadi.
Later he continued his studies in Qom with Tabatabai and Boroujerdi. 

He wrote Shahid-e Javid (The Eternal Martyr), which he started to conceive in 1961. It radically reinterpreted early Shii history. Despite the author's house arrest, it is in its fifth printing in Iran. Many books have been published in response to it, including by such distinguished ulama as Ayatollah Motahari (d. 1979) and Ayatollah Mohammad-Reza Golpaygani (d. 1993).

In his essay Vahdat-e Islami, Najafabadi advocates steps towards Shii and Sunni ecumenism. He believes Shii ulama should be permitted to follow Sunni fiqh in certain areas and vice versa. The article was banned by the  Special Court for the Clergy.

He died in Tehran in 2006.

Students

Among those present were his lessons were Mahdavi Kani, Hashemi Rafsanjani, Mohammadi Gilani, mahfouzi, Hassan Sanei, Lahooti Eshkevari, Rabbani Amlashi, Mousavi Yazdi, Emami Kashani, Mohammad Ali kousha.
Hashemi Rafsanjani said in introducing his professors:
We, of course, but much more the teachers who influenced us one of Ayatollah Hossein Ali Montazeri were of course at higher levels and in the premises of late Saeedi and Professors who are alive: Ayatollah Salehi Najaf-Abadi, Mr Meshkini, Mr. Mujahid, Mr. Soltani and Mr. fakoori that they were truly pious and pure men.resalat newspaper 18 August 1989

In the summer of 2006 Mohammad Ali Kousha|Mohammad Ali kousha student and close friend of Salehi Najafabad, along with Mohsen kadivar and Mohammad ali Ayazi action for the Foundation for the Publication of Ayatollah Salehi Najafabadi was under Saleh Foundation

Works and Publications
(in Persian)
 Shahid-e Javid (The Eternal Martyr) (Qom 1968)
 Tautee-ye Shah bar zedde Imam Khomeini (The Shah's Conspiracy against Khomeini) (1984) 
 Vahdat-e Islami (Islamic Unity) (article, 1985)
 hokoumate salehan(righteous government) (Qom 1983)

See also
Ayatollah Montazeri
Vilayat-e Faqih (disambiguation)

References

Further reading and External Links
 The Failed Pan-Islamic Program of the Islamic Republic By Wilfried Buchta
 Nematollah Salehi Najafabadi's List of Published Books, Amazon
 Hejab in the Islamic Republic By Fatemeh Sadeghi
 The Politics of Shahid-e Javid
 Download all books
 Goodreads profile and books

 

1920s births
2006 deaths
Iranian reformists
Iranian writers
Iranian Shia clerics
Muslim reformers
Year of birth uncertain
People who have been placed under house arrest in Iran